The Ayliffe technique is a hand washing technique (a step-by-step approach), which is attributed to Graham Ayliffe et al., specifically for health care services. The technique has been adopted by the World Health Organization (WHO) and is similar to EN 1500. Evidence suggests that it reduces microbial load on hands.

See also 
 Hand washing

References

External links 
 https://www.nhs.uk/live-well/healthy-body/best-way-to-wash-your-hands/
 Keeping hospitals clean: how nurses can reduce health-care-associated infection

Hand
Hygiene
Medical hygiene
Sanitation